Brett Swain may refer to:

 Brett Swain (actor), Australian actor
 Brett Swain (gridiron football) (born 1985), Canadian football wide receiver
 Brett Swain (cricketer) (born 1974), Australian cricketer